Devin Patrick Dwyer (born 1982/1983) is an American television journalist and digital reporter. He is ABC News' senior Washington reporter and leads network coverage of the U.S. Supreme Court. He has covered policy, politics and legal affairs at the network since 2009. He was the network's off-air reporter on President Obama's re-election campaign in 2012.

Early life and education
A native of Minneapolis, Minnesota, Dwyer, the son of Robert Dwyer, Jr. and Anne Wilwerding, graduated from Dartmouth College and Columbia University Graduate School of Journalism.

Career
Prior to a career in journalism, Dwyer was a high school social studies instructor and distance running coach in Atlanta. He got his start as a reporter at Georgia Public Broadcasting.

He joined ABC News in 2009 after several years as a public radio reporter and producer in Atlanta, Georgia, and in New York City. His feature radio and video stories have aired on NPR, American Public Media, PBS and Frontline.

Dwyer is a regular contributor to ABC News Live, GMA3, Good Morning America, ABC World News, Nightline, and ABCNews.com.

Personal life
Dwyer married his husband, Adam Joseph Ciarleglio, on July 3, 2016.

See also

 List of people from Minneapolis
 List of Columbia University Graduate School of Journalism people
 List of Dartmouth College alumni
 List of television reporters

References

1980s births
Living people
Place of birth missing (living people)
20th-century American writers
21st-century American non-fiction writers
ABC News personalities
American male journalists
American political journalists
American Public Media
American radio reporters and correspondents
American television reporters and correspondents
Columbia University Graduate School of Journalism alumni
Dartmouth College alumni
Journalists from Minnesota
LGBT people from Minnesota
NPR personalities
PBS people
Writers from Minneapolis
American LGBT journalists
21st-century American male writers
21st-century LGBT people